Zamir Kabulov (born 22 June 1954) is a high rank career diplomat and Russian presidential envoy to Afghanistan. He is the Special Representative for Afghanistan since 2022

Kabulov, who was born in Soviet Uzbekistan, graduated from the Moscow State Institute of International Relations in 1977, and went on to work in various diplomatic posts in the central offices of the Ministry of Foreign Affairs and abroad, in particular in Afghanistan. His Central Asian background further bolstered his position in dealing with Afghan and Pakistani issues. From 1979 to 1983 he worked in the Soviet Embassy in Iran.

From 1983 to 1987 he was second secretary in the Soviet Embassy in Kabul also responsible for relations with the press. From 1987 to 1991 he worked in the Foreign Ministry in Moscow and studied at the Diplomatic Academy in Moscow. In 1991-1992 he was councillor at the Soviet/Russian embassy in Kabul and after the embassy was closed down when the mujahideen took control of Kabul he was posted to the Russian Embassy in Pakistan.

In 1995 Kabulov took part in talks with the Taliban in an attempt to secure the release of a Russian Il-76 crew whose plane was forced to land in Kandahar. During these talks he met with the Taliban leader Mullah Mohammed Omar. Between 19961998, Kabulov was a senior political adviser in a special mission of the United Nations for Afghanistan, based in Pakistan. Between 1998 and 2004 Kabulov worked as the Foreign Ministry's Deputy Director of the Third Department on Asia, and was a special representative of the Foreign Minister during the 2001 Bonn Agreement talks on Afghanistan.

On 18 March 2004, Kabulov presented his diplomatic credentials to Hamid Karzai, the head of the Transitional Islamic State of Afghanistan. Kabulov has been critical of the NATO mission in Afghanistan, calling it ineffective, due to alleged negligence by NATO in understanding the national, religious and cultural traditions of Afghanistan.

The New York Times correspondent John F. Burns, who interviewed Ambassador Kabulov in October 2008, alleges that  Kabulov “is no ordinary ambassador, having served as a K.G.B. agent in Kabul — and eventually as the K.G.B. resident, Moscow's top spy — in the 1980s and 1990s, during and after the nine-year Soviet military occupation.”

In 2019, Kabulov stated to the Associated Press that the United States "completely failed" in Afghanistan, and allowed Moscow to be a peace broker in the region.

See also
Ambassador of Russia to Afghanistan

References

1954 births
Living people
Moscow State Institute of International Relations alumni
Diplomatic Academy of the Ministry of Foreign Affairs of the Russian Federation alumni
Ambassador Extraordinary and Plenipotentiary (Russian Federation)
Ambassadors of Russia to Afghanistan
Russian expatriates in Pakistan